Edmund William Tobin (September 14, 1865 – June 24, 1938) was a Canadian politician.

Born in Brompton Falls, Canada East, he was a lumber merchant and manufacturer who was President of the Lotbiniere Lumber Company in Lester, Quebec and President of the Trois-Pistoles Pulp Company in Trois-Pistoles, Quebec. He was Warden of the County of Richmond in 1897-98 and Mayor of Brompton Falls. He was first elected to the House of Commons of Canada for the riding of Richmond—Wolfe in the 1900 federal election. A Liberal, he would be re-elected every time for the next 7 elections until being summoned to the Senate of Canada on the advice of William Lyon Mackenzie King in 1930 representing the senatorial division of Victoria, Quebec. He would serve until his death in 1938.

His grandsons, Edmund Tobin Asselin (1920–1999) and Joseph Patrick Tobin Asselin (1930–2005), were both Members of Parliament.

References
 The Canadian Parliament; biographical sketches and photo-engravures of the senators and members of the House of Commons of Canada. Being the tenth Parliament, elected November 3, 1904

External links
 

1865 births
1938 deaths
Canadian senators from Quebec
Liberal Party of Canada MPs
Liberal Party of Canada senators
Mayors of places in Quebec
Members of the House of Commons of Canada from Quebec